Saikuraa Ibrahim Naeem (SINAF)(1935–2008) was a Maldivian writer and government officer.

Ibrahim Naeem began serving the government in 1953, when he was 18 years of age.

After many years working in various posts in the government of the Maldives, he served the last seventeen years of his life at the President's Office.

Despite his high status and respect accorded to him, Naeem led a simple life and kept away from un-Maldivian luxury and excessive display of wealth.

Works
Saikuraa Ibrahim Naeem was a writer and a poet. Most of his writings were published under his pen name " SINAF."
  Mr.Ibrahim Naeem was the editor of the famous daily news " Moonlight" which was the most popular daily paper in Maldives during President Nadir's regime. which was He wrote love stories in his earlier time as a writer, the most popular one was "Yamanuge Mausooma" . He wrote many song lyrics, and poems.Some of his lyrics are:-
Mi zahar leyaa gulheythan nudhekeysha maruvedhaanan (Vocal:Ibrahim Hamdhee)
2. Naazuku loabi dhiyaeema ruimey..(Vocal:Ibrahim Hamdhee)
3. Nunidheynehaa sazaadhee (Vocal: Ibrahim Hamdhee - Mahmoodha Shakeeb

He also was a good orator using humour and good-quality language, and Maldivians liked the wit in his speech.

Notes

1935 births
2008 deaths
Maldivian writers
Maldivian poets
20th-century Maldivian writers
21st-century Maldivian writers